Pokrov may refer to:
Pokrov, Ukraine, a town in Ukraine
Pokrov (Russian) or Pokrova (Ukrainian), name for the Intercession of the Theotokos, one of the Orthodox feasts
Pokrov Urban Settlement, a municipal formation into which the town of Pokrov in Pokrovsky District of Vladimir Oblast is incorporated
Pokrov, Russia, several inhabited localities in Russia
Pokrov Cemetery, a cemetery in Riga, Latvia

See also
Pokrovka (disambiguation)
Pokrovsky (disambiguation)
Novopokrovka (disambiguation)